Over 27,000 Australians were killed and 23,000 wounded in action during World War II. In addition, hundreds more servicemen and women were killed and injured in accidents during the war.

Casualties by service

The following table is taken from The Final Campaigns by Gavin Long. It excludes deaths and illnesses from natural causes, including disease.

Non-battle casualties
The Australian Army suffered 1,165 killed and died of injuries in operational areas and a further 33,396 soldiers were wounded or injured. Casualties in non-operational areas were also significant, with 2,051 soldiers being killed or dying of injuries and 121,800 being wounded or injured. These figures also exclude deaths and illnesses from natural causes. The RAN suffered 177 non-battle casualties and the RAAF 6,271.

Notes

References
  
 

Military history of Australia during World War II
1940s in Australia
World War II casualties by nationality